The 1955 Richmond Spiders football team was an American football team that represented the University of Richmond as a member of the Southern Conference (SoCon) during the 1955 college football season ). Led by fifth-year head coach Ed Merrick, the Spiders compiled an overall record of 4–3–2 with a mark of 3–2–2 in conference, placing fifth in the SoCon. The team's captains were Frank Pajaczkowski and Erik Christensen.

Schedule

References

Richmond
Richmond Spiders football seasons
Richmond Spiders football